The Serbia women's national under-20 volleyball team represents Serbia in international women's volleyball competitions and friendly matches under the age 20 and it is ruled by the Serbian Volleyball Federation That is an affiliate of International Volleyball Federation FIVB and also a part of European Volleyball Confederation CEV.

Results

FIVB U21 World Championship
 Champions   Runners up   Third place   Fourth place

Europe U21 Championship
 Champions   Runners up   Third place   Fourth place

Europe U19 Championship
 Champions   Runners up   Third place   Fourth place

Current squad
The following is the Serbian roster in the 2019 FIVB Volleyball Women's U20 World Championship.

Head coach: Marijana Boricic

References

External links
 Official website 

National women's under-20 volleyball teams
under